The Men's 1500m Freestyle event at the 2007 Pan American Games took place at the Maria Lenk Aquatic Park in Rio de Janeiro, Brazil. The first two heats were held on 2007-07-20, while the fastest heat based on entry times was staged a day later.

Medalists

Results

Notes

References
agendapan
For the Record, Swimming World Magazine, September 2007 (p. 48+49)

Freestyle, Men's 1500m